The Wausau Lumberjacks (occasionally known as the Timberjacks) were a minor league baseball team based in Wausau, Wisconsin that existed on-and-off from 1905 to 1957. The Wausau franchise then became the Wausau Timbers before relocating to become today's Kane County Cougars.  The Lumberjacks played in the Wisconsin State League (1905–1907, 1946–1949), Wisconsin–Illinois League (1908, 1912–1914), Minnesota–Wisconsin League (1909–1911) and Northern League (1936–1939, 1956–1957).

The team was affiliated with the Cleveland Indians (1936–1937), Milwaukee Brewers (1938), St. Louis Browns (1947–1949) and Cincinnati Redlegs (1956–1957). The team played its home games at Athletic Park from 1936 to 1957.

The Ballpark
The Lumberjacks played at Athletic Park, located at 324 E. Wausau Ave. Wausau, Wisconsin 

Originally built in 1936, Athletic Park was also home to the Timbers of the Class-A Midwest League (1975-1990) and the Wausau Timberjacks (1950–1953). The park hosted the  Lumberjacks in three separate incarnations (1936-1942, 1946–1949, 1956–57).

Currently, since 1994, Athletic Field has hosted the Wisconsin Woodchucks of the summer collegiate Northwoods League}.

Notable players
Ray Boone played for the Lumberjacks in 1942. Boone enjoyed a 13-year big league career (1943–1960). Ray was the patriarch of the Boone family, followed by son, Bob Boone and grandsons Brett Boone and Aaron Boone. The Boone family was the first to send three generations to the All-Star Game. Ray led the AL in RBIs in 1955. He was a 2x All-Star and World Series Champion with the Detroit Tigers. Boone had career stats of: .275, 151 HR, 737 RBI.

Vada Pinson played for the Lumberjacks in 1956. Pinson enjoyed an 18-year big league career (1958–1975). Pinson combined power, speed and was Gold Glove Award winning center fielder. His best years were with the Cincinnati Reds (1958–1968). Vada twice led the National League in hits (1961, 1963). He batted .343 in 1961, when the Reds won the pennant. He was a National League All-Star 4x. Pinson had career stats of: .286, 256 HR, 1,170 RBI. He had 2,757 hits in his stellar career.

Notable alumni

 Phil Masi (1937) 3 x MLB All-Star; 
 Dickie Kerr (1927) MLB: 20 game winner
 Wally Gilbert (1939–40, 1941–42)
 Ray Boone (1942) 2 x MLB All-Star; 1955 NL RBI Leader
 Fred Schulte (1946, MGR) 
 Ryne Duren (1949) 3 x MLB All-Star; 1958 AL Saves Leader
 Mike Tresh (1952) MLB All-Star
 Bob Bruce (1953) 
 Vada Pinson (1956) 2 x MLB All-Star; 2,757 MLB hits
 Jack Baldschun (1957) 
 Dave Bristol (1957) MLB Manager
 Cookie Rojas (1957) 5 x MLB-All Star

References

External links
Baseball Reference

Baseball teams established in 1905
Baseball teams disestablished in 1957
Defunct minor league baseball teams
Northern League (1902-71) baseball teams
Wisconsin State League teams
Wisconsin-Illinois League teams
Minnesota-Wisconsin League teams
Cincinnati Reds minor league affiliates
Detroit Tigers minor league affiliates
St. Louis Browns minor league affiliates
Cleveland Guardians minor league affiliates
Philadelphia Phillies minor league affiliates
Sports in Wausau, Wisconsin
1905 establishments in Wisconsin
1957 disestablishments in Wisconsin
Defunct baseball teams in Wisconsin